Voldemārs Vimba (31 May 1904 – September 1985) was a Latvian painter. His work was part of the painting event in the art competition at the 1936 Summer Olympics.

References

1904 births
1985 deaths
20th-century Latvian painters
Olympic competitors in art competitions
Painters from Saint Petersburg